The Venetian Acropolis Castle is a castle on the Butrint Peninsula. The castle is located by the Channel of Vivari and close to the neighboring Venetian Castle Venetian Triangular Castle and the Butrint National Park. In 1386 the Venetians purchased the land around Butrint from the Angevins. The Castle was shortly built after the purchase of the land in the 14th century.The castle was built on the highest point of the Peninsula and was easiest to be defended. In 1572 when the wars between Venetian and the Ottomans had been occurring this left Venetian Acropolis Castle abandoned. This led to the creation of The Venetian Triangular Castle which was built in the 15th century which was across the Channel of Vivari from the now abandoned Venetian Acropolis Castle. The Venetian Triangular Castle was created for a replacement settlement after abandoning the Venetian Acropolis Castle.The castle had fishing traps to protect the very important source of food and income for the new Venetian Triangular Castle settlement. The castle and land came under French rule in 1797. In 1799 Ali Pasha of Tepelena conquered it and it joined the Ottoman Empire until Albanian Independence in 1912. The Castle Today was Restored/Rebuilt by Luigi Maria Ugolini in 1936 and now houses a museum.

Gallery

See also
Venetian Triangular Castle
Butrint
Butrint National Park
Lake Butrint
Channel of Vivari
List of castles in Albania
Tourism in Albania
History of Albania

References

External links

Castles in Albania
Venetian fortifications
Buildings and structures in Sarandë
Venetian rule in the Ionian Islands